Nicolás Talpone (born 9 April 1996) is an Argentine professional footballer who plays as a midfielder for Estudiantes RC.

Career
Talpone spent his youth career with Círculo Tolosano, ADAFI and Estudiantes. He made his senior professional debut for Argentine Primera División side Estudiantes on 11 April 2016, he was subbed on for Augusto Solari with seven minutes to play in a 3–2 victory over Atlético Tucumán. His first start for the club arrived on 7 April 2017 during a 1–4 win away to Aldosivi, which was one of three appearances in 2016–17. Talpone was loaned out in July 2018 to Agropecuario in Primera B Nacional.

Career statistics
.

References

External links

1996 births
Living people
Footballers from La Plata
Argentine footballers
Association football midfielders
Argentine Primera División players
Primera Nacional players
Estudiantes de La Plata footballers
Club Agropecuario Argentino players
Club Atlético Atlanta footballers
Estudiantes de Río Cuarto footballers